Poppo can mean:

 Bubo, Duke of the Frisians, also spelled Poppo (674–734), a king of Friesland
 Poppo of Grapfeld (died 839/41), an early ninth-century ancestor of the Babenbergs
 Poppo, Duke of Thuringia (died after 906), a margrave
 Poppo I, Bishop of Würzburg (941–961)
 Poppo II, Bishop of Würzburg (961–983)
 Poppo (bishop of Kraków) (died 1008?)
 Poppo of Treffen, Patriarch of Aquileia from 1019 to 1045
 Poppo (archbishop of Trier) (986–1047)
 Pope Damasus II (died 1048), whose birthname was Poppo
 Poppo of Stavelot (Saint Poppo of Deinze, 977–1048), an abbot
 Poppo von Paderborn (died 1083), Bishop of Paderborn from 1076
 Poppo II, Margrave of Carniola and Istria (died 1098)
 Poppo I of Blankenburg (ca. 1095–1161 or 1164), Count of Blankenburg
 Poppo von Osterna (died 1257), a Grandmaster of the Teutonic Knights
 Poppo III von Trimberg, Bishop of Würzburg (1267–1271)
 Ernst Friedrich Poppo (1794–1866), a German scholar
 Ronald Edward Poppo (born 1947), American victim of the 2012 Miami cannibal attack

See also 

 Pidgey, the English name for Poppo in the Pokémon series